Sree Agrasain College is a self-financing undergraduate college in Kolkata, West Bengal, India. It is in Howrah district. It is affiliated with the University of Calcutta.

Departments

Science
Computer Science
Mathematics
Physics
Electronics

Commerce & Business Administration 
B.Com. (Hons.)
B.Com. (General)
B.B.A. (Hons.)

Arts
Bengali
English
Hindi
History
Geography
Political Science

See also 
List of colleges affiliated to the University of Calcutta
Education in India
Education in West Bengal

References

External links
Sree Agrasain College

University of Calcutta affiliates
Universities and colleges in Kolkata
Universities and colleges in Howrah district
Educational institutions in India with year of establishment missing